The Third Legislature of Quebec was the provincial legislature of Quebec, Canada from 1875 to 1878, following the general election of 1875.

In the 1875 election, Premier Charles Boucher de Boucherville and the Conservative Party of Quebec won a majority in the Legislative Assembly and continued in office with a majority government. However, in 1878, de Boucherville was dismissed from office by the Lieutenant Governor of Quebec Luc Letellier de Saint-Just, who appointed Henri-Gustave Joly de Lotbinière, the leader of the Quebec Liberal Party as premier.

Joly de Lotbinière formed a minority government.  It was the first time the Liberals were in office since Quebec had been created in 1867, and the first minority government in Quebec's history. Lotbinière immediately called a general election due to the minority status of his government.

The Legislature held three annual sessions, with the first session called on November 4, 1875. The Legislature was dissolved on March 22, 1878, leading to the 1878 general election on May 1, 1878.

Structure of the Legislature 

The Legislature of Quebec was created by the British North America Act, 1867.  It consisted of the Lieutenant Governor of Quebec, the Legislative Assembly and the Legislative Council.  The Lieutenant Governor was appointed by the Governor General of Canada for a term of five years.  The Legislative Assembly consisted of sixty-five members, elected in single-member constituencies by first-past-the-post elections.  The Legislative Assembly was to last for four years, subject to being dissolved earlier by the Lieutenant Governor.  The Legislative Council consisted of twenty-four members, appointed for life by the Government of Quebec.

Elections and qualifications

Right to vote 

The 1875 election for the Legislative Assembly had been the first time the secret ballot was used in Quebec.  Prior to 1875, voting had been by open ballotting, where voters publicly declared their vote to the polling officials.

The right to vote in elections to the Legislative Assembly was not universal.  Only male British subjects (by birth or naturalisation), aged 21 or older, were eligible to vote, and only if they met a property qualification.  For residents of larger cities, the qualification was to own or occupy real property assessed at three hundred dollars or more.  For tenants, the qualification was paying an annual rent of thirty dollars or more.  For any other municipality, the qualification was to own or occupy real property assessed at two hundred dollars or more, or twenty dollars in annual value. For tenants in smaller centers, the qualification was paying an annual rent of twenty dollars or more.

Women were completely barred from voting.

Judges and many municipal and provincial officials were also barred from voting, particularly officials with law enforcement duties, or duties relating to public revenue. The Returning Officer in each riding was also barred from voting, except when needed to give a casting vote in the event of a tie vote.

Qualification for the Legislative Assembly 

Candidates for election to the Legislative Assembly had to meet stricter qualifications than voters.  In addition to being male, twenty-one or older, and a subject of Her Majesty (by birth or naturalisation), a candidate had to be free from all legal incapacity, and be the proprietor in possession of lands or tenements worth at least $2,000, over and above all encumbrances and charges on the property.

Women were completely barred from membership in the Assembly.

Qualification for the Legislative Council 

The qualifications for the members of the Legislative Council were the same as for the members of the Senate of Canada.

Those requirements were:
 Be of the full age of thirty years;
 Be a British subject, either natural-born or naturalised;
 Possess real property in Quebec worth at least $4,000, over and above any debts or incumbrances on the property;
 Have a net worth of at least $4,000, over and above debts and liabilities;
 Reside in Quebec;
 Reside in, or possess his qualifying real property, in the division he was named to represent.

The provisions of the British North America Act, 1867 did not explicitly bar women from being called to the Senate of Canada.  However, until the Persons Case in 1929, it was assumed that women could not be called to the Senate, and were thus also barred from the Legislative Council.  In any event, no woman was ever appointed to the Legislative Council.

Events of the Third Legislature 

Boucher de Boucherville and the Conservatives won a strong majority in the 1875 election, 44 out of the 65 seats in the Legislative Assembly.  In the first session of the Legislature, the government directed an investigation into the Tanneries scandal, which had brought down the government of former Premier Gédéon Ouimet prior to the election.

However, the political situation became unstable when the federal Liberal government appointed a new lieutenant governor, Luc Letellier de St-Just, after the death in office of Lieutenant Governor René-Édouard Caron.  Letellier de St-Just was a strongly partisan Liberal, and continued to be so after his appointment to the position of lieutenant governor.  He was critical of the measures taken by the Conservative government. At the same time, Boucher de Boucherville appears to have taken for granted that the Lieutenant Governor would automatically give his formal approval to government measures, as required by the principles of responsible government, to the point where Boucher de Boucherville issued some proclamations on behalf of the lieutenant governor, without consulting Letellier de St-Just.

The matter came to a head in 1878, over a series of railway measures.  The Quebec government was cash-strapped, and the Legislature passed statutes to require municipalities to contribute to the cost of building railways which ran through them.  Letellier de St-Just concluded that these bills were unconstitutional and on March 2, 1878 he dismissed Boucher de Boucherville as premier.  He called on the Leader of the Opposition, Henri-Gustave Joly de Lotbinière, to form a government, even though the Liberals were in the minority in the Legislative Assembly.  One of Joly de Lotbinière's first acts as premier was to advise the Lieutenant Governor to dissolve the Assembly and call a general election, the election of 1878, which returned a minority government for the Liberals.

The dismissal caused a constitutional and political crisis in Quebec, where the dismissal was referred to as a coup d'état. It also had reverberations in Ottawa.  The Liberal government of Prime Minister Alexander Mackenzie had not been consulted and were caught by surprise.  Mackenzie and Wilfrid Laurier privately condemned the dismissal.  The government were attacked by the Conservative opposition for the actions of the lieutenant governor, which were alleged to be contrary to the principles of the neutrality of the Crown.

Legislative Assembly

Party standings 

The 1875 election returned a majority in the Legislative Assembly for the Conservative Party, led by Premier Boucher de Boucherville.

Members of the Legislative Assembly 

The following candidates were elected to the Legislative Assembly in the 1875 election. The Premier of Quebec is indicated by Bold italics.  The Speakers of the Legislative Assembly are indicated by small caps. Cabinet Ministers are indicated by Italics.

Reasons for Vacancies

By-elections 

There were thirteen by-elections during the term of the Third Legislature. Cabinet ministers are indicated by italics.

Legislative Council

Party standings

The Conservatives had a strong majority in the Legislative Council throughout the Third Legislature.

Members during the Third Legislature

The Premier of Quebec is indicated by Bold italics. The Speakers of the Legislative Council are indicated by small caps. Cabinet members are indicated by italics.

Vacancies of less than one month are not shown.
† Died in office.

Executive Council during Third Legislature 

There were two different ministries during the term of the Third Legislature, under Premiers Boucher de Boucherville (1875-1878) and Joly de Lotbinière (1878).

Third Quebec Ministry: Boucher de Boucherville Cabinet (1875-1878)

Following the 1875 election, Boucher de Boucherville made some changes to the Cabinet, but largely retained the previous composition.

Fourth Quebec Ministry:  Joly de Lotbinière Cabinet (1878 - 1879)

Following the dismissal of Boucher de Boucherville in 1878, the Lieutenant Governor appointed Henri-Gustave Joly de Lotbinière as Premier.  Because of his lack of majority in the Assembly, Joly de Lotbinière found it necessary to appoint two individuals to Cabinet who did not initially have seats in the Assembly: David Alexander Ross as Attorney General and François Langelier as Commissioner of Crown lands. The only Cabinet member from the Legislative Council was Henry Starnes, the Speaker. Joly de Lotbinière then immediately advised the Lieutenant Governor to dissolve the Legislative Assembly and call a general election.  Returned to office, Joly de Lotbinière initially retained the ministers in the same positions, but carried out a Cabinet shuffle the next year, in 1879.  In 1879, Joly de Lotbinière appointed Honoré Mercier to cabinet, even though Mercier did not initially have a seat in the Legislative Assembly.

Leaders of the Opposition 

There were two leaders of the Opposition during the Third Legislature. Joly de Lotbinière was leader for most of the term of the Legislature, from 1875 to 1878.  When Joly de Lotbinière was appointed premier in 1878, Boucher de Boucherville technically became the leader of the Opposition, but he did not sit in that capacity, as the Legislature was not in session. Joly de Lotbinière called an election two weeks after being appointed premier, without any sittings of the Legislature.

Legislative sessions 

The Legislature had three annual sessions:

 First session: November 4, 1875 to December 24, 1875, with thirty-eight sitting days.
 Second session: November 10, 1876 to December 28, 1876, with thirty-five sitting days.
 Third and final session: December 19, 1877 to March 9, 1878, with forty-two sitting days.

The Legislature was dissolved on March 22, 1878.

References 

003